This is a list of people involved with Memorial University of Newfoundland.

Chancellors

Presidents

Founders
 Vincent Patrick Burke

Notable alumni

Academics and scholars
 David Agnew, president, Seneca College of Applied Arts and Technology, former Secretary of Cabinet, Government of Ontario
 Gary Botting, poet, playwright, lawyer and legal scholar
 Donald B. Dingwell, D.Sc. (h.c. mult.) FMSA FGAC MAE FAGU FRSC BVK ACATECH ML FAAAS, award-winning experimental geoscientist, past President of the European Geosciences Union, 3rd Secretary-General of the European Research Council, President of the International Association of Volcanology and Chemistry of the Earth's Interior
 Robert Gellately, historian
 John Gosse
 George Ivany, President, University of Saskatchewan
 Mary C. Lobban, British physiologist 
 Brian Pratt, award-winning paleontologist and sedimentologist, Fellow of the Geological Society of America, and past president of the Geological Association of Canada
 Harold Williams, geologist and world expert on the tectonics of mountain belts

Business

 Nick Careen - Vice President at Air Canada
 Moya Greene - President and CEO of Royal Mail
 Lorraine Mitchelmore - President and Country Chair and Executive Vice President Heavy Oil for Shell Canada
 Barry Perry - CEO at Fortis Inc.
 Una Power - CFO at Nexen Inc.
 Larry Short, CPA - CBC Contributor, Executive Director, and Portfolio Manager at ShortFinancial
 Jane Rowe - President of Teachers Private Capital, the private equity arm of the Ontario Teachers' Pension Plan

Politics and government

 KM Chan - biochemistry professor and politician
 Gen. Rick Hillier - Chief of the Defence Staff, Canadian Forces
 Dale Kirby - Minister of Education and Early Childhood Development
 Allan Rowe - MPP for Dartmouth South and liberal caucus whip, former television host
 Clyde Wells - Chief Justice of the Supreme Court of Newfoundland and Labrador, former Premier of Newfoundland and Labrador
 Danny Williams - former Premier of Newfoundland and Labrador

Film and television

 Bill Gillespie - former Security Correspondent, CBC Radio
 Tristan Homer - children's television producer
 Bhreagh MacNeil - Canadian Screen Award nominated actress
 Mark McKinney - comedian, member of The Kids in the Hall
 Scott Oake - sportscaster for CBC Sports

Press and literature

 Anne Chislett - playwright

 Michael Crummey - novelist and poet
 Gwynne Dyer - journalist, syndicated columnist and military historian, Senior Lecturer in War Studies at the Royal Military Academy Sandhurst (1973–1977)
 Tom Harrington - journalist
 Wayne Johnston - novelist
 Rex Murphy - journalist and commentator

Art and music

 Alan Doyle - musician 
 Duo Concertante -Nancy Dahn on violin and Tim Steeves on piano
 Bob Hallett - musician
 Andy Jones - comedian
 Séan McCann - musician
 Fergus O'Byrne - musician
 Shelley Posen - folklorist and singer-songwriter
 Erin Power - musician, The Swinging Belles 
 Laura Winter - musician, The Swinging Belles

Science
Carolyn Relf - geologist

Sports

 Brad Gushue - Olympic gold medallist (curling)
 Mark Nichols - Olympic gold medallist (curling)

Medicine 
 Dr. Norman R.C. Campbell – Professor of Medicine, Community Health Sciences and Physiology and Pharmacology at the University of Calgary
 Ranjit Chandra - Former professor of Medicine, forced to resign after allegations of scientific misconduct and data fabrication
 Jawahar Kalra – physician, clinical researcher, and academic

Crime
 Shirley Turner – Murderer whose murder of her son Zachary gave rise to the movie Dear Zachary

Notable faculty, past and present

University Research Professors

(Note: "University Research Professor" is the name for MUN's highest academic honour. One can be a full professor, even conducting research, at the university without being a "University Research Professor.")
 Ian Jordaan - engineer and world expert on design of offshore structures in harsh environments
 Harold Williams - geologist and world expert on the tectonics of mountain belts

Other faculty
Jean Briggs - anthropologist and expert on Inuit languages
Lindsay Cahill - chemist
John Frederick Dewey - structural geologist. Fellow of the Royal Society and member of the United States National Academy of Sciences; Wollaston Medal & Penrose Medal recipient. 
 Donald Hillman - paediatrician and professor of pediatrics best known for working in Third World countries in international child health and development
 Francesca M. Kerton - chemist
 Elliott Leyton - renowned for studies of serial murderers
 Elizabeth Miller - 19th century British Gothic literature
 Ward Neale - geologist 
 Robert Paine - Anthropologist studying the Inuit and Saami peoples. 
 Patrick Parfrey - nephrologist and clinical epidemiologist
 Augustus Rowe - former Minister of Health of Newfoundland and Labrador; former chairman of Memorial University's Department of Family Medicine

Rhodes Scholars

 Sean Connors - 1987 - physician
 Robert Joy - actor
 Moses Morgan - 1938
 Rex Murphy - 1968 - TV commentator
 Fabian O'Dea - 1939
 Laura Pittman - 2013 - engineer
 Bill Rowe - 1964
 Danny Williams - 1969 - Premier of Newfoundland and Labrador

Honorary degree recipients
 Sarah Anala - Canadian social worker
 Anne, Princess Royal - member of the Canadian Royal family
 Lloyd Axworthy - Canadian politician
 Jean Chrétien - 20th Prime Minister of Canada
 Bob Cole - CBC hockey commentator 
 John Frederick Dewey - geologist
 Craig Dobbin - businessman
 Gwynne Dyer - journalist
 John Kenneth Galbraith - economist
 Loyola Hearn - former Minister of Fisheries and Oceans
 Ron Hynes - folk musician
 David Lloyd Johnston - Governor General of Canada
 Cathy Jones - comedian and actress
 Aung San Suu Kyi - pro-democracy advocate
 HRH Princess Mary - member of the Canadian Royal Family
 Rick Mercer - Canadian comedian and television personality
 Brian Mulroney - 18th Prime Minister of Canada
 Ward Neale - geologist 
 Lester B. Pearson - 14th Prime Minister of Canada, Nobel Peace Prize winner
 Raymond Price - geologist
 Edward Shackleton - geographer and politician
 David Suzuki - Canadian science broadcaster and environmental activist
 Mary Walsh - comedian
 John Tuzo Wilson - geophysicist

References

Memorial University of Newfoundland
Memorial University of Newfoundland
Memorial University of Newfoundland